There are 11 national parks in Morocco. Toubkal National Park, established in 1942, is the oldest and by far the most visited. The parks are situated rather well in-line, so it already allows wildlife migration to some extent. The only missing component in this wildlife corridor is a gap between Al-Hoceima and Seghir (so roughly at the location of Hakkama). Closing this gap would facilitate wildlife passage (of mainly birds) to the Spanish park of Los Alcornocales.

National parks
 Al Hoceima National Park
 Dakhla National Park (see Dakhla)
 Haut Atlas Oriental National Park
 Ifrane National Park
 Iriqui National Park
 Khenifiss National Park
 Khenifra National Park
 Souss-Massa National Park
 Talassemtane National Park
 Tazekka National Park
 Toubkal National Park
 Merdja Zerka National Park (Permanent Biological Reserve)

See also
List of national parks
 List of national parks in Africa

References

External links
National parks and reserves of Morocco
Map showing the location of all national parks in Morocco

Morocco
 List
National parks
National parks